William Binnington Boyce (9 November 1804 – 8 March 1889) was an English-born philologist and clergyman, active in Australia.

Early life
Boyce was born at Beverley, Yorkshire, England, is mother's family were Wesleyans. Boyce studied commerce at Kingston upon Hull. He entered the Wesleyan ministry and in 1830 was sent to Buntingvale, Eastern Cape Province, South Africa with instructions to compile a grammar of the Kaffir language. He did this while working as a missionary and published it in 1834 under the title of A Grammar of the Kafir Language (Spelt with one "f" in the first edition). A second edition, A Grammar of the Kaffir Language expanded and improved with Vocabulary and Exercises by William J. Davis, was published in 1844, and a third in 1863. Boyce was recalled to England in 1843, serving at a church at Bolton, Lancashire for two years.

Australia
Boyce was then sent to Australia as general superintendent of the Wesleyan missions. He arrived at Sydney in January 1846, carried on his work vigorously, and was elected president of the first Wesleyan conference held in Australia. In August 1847 he edited and published the weekly Gleaner. He published in 1849 A Brief Grammar of Modern Geography, For the Use of Schools. In 1850 he was appointed one of the original sixteen members of the senate of the University of Sydney and took a special interest in the formation of the university library. Brusque at times, he had little time for 'unthinking parrots who repeat without understanding the dogmas and sayings of the popularities of the day'. In 1859 Boyce resigned and went to England to become one of the general secretaries of foreign missions. He edited in 1874 a Memoir of the Rev. William Shaw, and in the same year appeared Statistics of Protestant Missionary Societies, 1872-3.

Boyce returned to Sydney in 1871 and took up church work again. He was a busy man, often doing much lecturing during the week and preaching three times on a Sunday. He also found time to do considerable literary work and brought out two important books, The Higher Criticism and the Bible (1881), and an Introduction to the Study of History (1884).

Late life and legacy
Early in 1885, at a dinner party in Sydney, he met J. A. Froude, who was much attracted to him (Oceania, p. 195). Working until the end, with his mind in full vigour, Boyce died suddenly at Glebe, Sydney on 8 March 1889 and was buried in the Wesleyan section of Rookwood cemetery. He was married twice (1) to a daughter of James Bowden and (2) to a daughter of the Hon. George Allen and was survived by four daughters by the first marriage. He presented two thousand volumes from his own library to the Wesleyan Theological Institution at Stanmore.

Boyce's Grammar of the Kaffir Language had special value as it formed the basis on which much of the study of other South African languages was built. His volume on The Higher Criticism and the Bible, and his Introduction to the Study of History, were both excellent books of their period, and his organizing power was shown in his bringing the Wesleyan Church in Australia to the state when it could free itself from requiring help from the missionary society in England.

A grandson, William Ralph Boyce Gibson (1869-1935), was professor of mental and moral philosophy at the university of Melbourne from 1911 to 1934 and was the author of several philosophical works. He was succeeded by his son, Alexander Boyce Gibson, born in 1900. A distant relative, born in 1994, Adam D. Binnington is currently a lecturer of Spanish in the town of Scarborough.

Works
 The Higher Criticism and the Bible (1881)
 Six Lectures on the Higher Criticism Upon the Old Testament (1878)
 A Grammar of the Kaffir Language
 Vocabulary and Exercises
 A Brief Grammar of Modern Geography, For the Use of Schools
 Statistics of Protestant Missionary Societies, 1872-3
 Introduction to the Study of History (1884)

References

Bibliography

Additional sources listed by the Australian Dictionary of Biography:
J. Colwell, The Illustrated History of Methodism (Sydney, 1904) 
J. Colwell (ed), A Century in the Pacific (Sydney, 1914) 
Weekly Advocate (Sydney), 16 Mar 1889
Nathaniel Turner journal, 1853 (State Library of New South Wales) 
Henry Parkes letters (State Library of New South Wales)
Wesleyan Methodist Australian District minutes, 1851-54 (State Library of New South Wales)
Wesleyan Methodist Conference, New South Wales and Queensland, 1890 (State Library of New South Wales)

1804 births
1889 deaths
English male writers
Australian Methodists
Wesleyan Methodists
Methodist missionaries in South Africa
Methodist missionaries in Australia
English Methodist missionaries